Anne Sewell Young (January 2, 1871 – August 15, 1961) was an American astronomer. She was an astronomy professor at Mount Holyoke College for 37 years.

Biography
Anne Sewell Young was born in Bloomington, Wisconsin on January 2, 1871, to Reverend Albert Adams Young and Mary Sewell.

She earned a B.L. from Minnesota's Carleton College in 1892. She then went to Walla Walla, Washington and taught mathematics at Whitman College for three years before returning to Carleton, earning her M.S. in 1897. She earned her Ph.D. from Columbia University in 1906. Her dissertation assessed measurements of early photographs and determined that the constellation Perseus had twice as many stars as previously thought.

Young started her career at Mount Holyoke College in 1898. She was appointed director of the John Payson Williston Observatory, where she supervised an observational program tracking sunspots. She organized events at the observatory for Mount Holyoke students and in 1925 arranged for the student body to take the train to central Connecticut to observe the total solar eclipse. In 1929, Young identified the comet 31P/Schwassmann–Wachmann with an object that had been misidentified as the minor planet "Adelaide" (A904 EB) in 1904.

Young had a pronounced interest in variable stars and corresponded on the subject with Edward Charles Pickering, director of the Harvard College Observatory. She was one of the eight founding members of the American Association of Variable Star Observers  (AAVSO) and contributed over 6,500 variable star observations to the organization. She was elected the organization's President in 1923.

Young retired in 1936 and was succeeded by her former student, Alice Hall Farnsworth, as director of the Williston Observatory. Young moved to Claremont, California with her sister; she died there on August 15, 1961.

References

1871 births
1961 deaths
American women astronomers
Carleton College alumni
Columbia University alumni
Mount Holyoke College faculty
People from Grant County, Wisconsin
Whitman College faculty